A camouflage passport is a document, designed to look like a real passport, issued in the name of a non-existent country or entity. It may be sold with matching documents, such as an international driver's license, club membership card, insurance documents or similar supporting identity papers. A camouflage passport is not a real, valid passport and is to be distinguished from a valid second passport, which an individual with dual citizenship may be eligible to hold, a novelty fantasy passport, or a fake of a real passport.

Origins
False identity documents have a long history, but in 1998, the idea of the camouflage passport was credited by the Financial Times to Donna Walker of Houston, who said she had got the idea ten years earlier when an American on a hijacked aircraft was shot because of his nationality. 

Walker said that she started by asking the Sri Lankan embassy whether they still had rights over the name Ceylon and, finding they did not, went on to ask the U.S. State Department whether producing a passport in that name would be legal, and they "couldn't show (her) it wasn't". Walker went on to produce hundreds of passports in different country names, trading as International Documents Service, and described her "finest hour" as being during the Iraqi invasion of Kuwait when a group of European oil executives were able to use her documents to pass through Iraqi checkpoints and escape to Jordan. 

She said the basic idea was to look like "a not very interesting man from a not very interesting country".

Form 
Camouflage passports are generally produced in the name of countries that no longer exist or have changed their name. 

Often these are former colonies that changed their name on independence, or use the names of places or political subdivisions that exist within a real country but have never issued or cannot issue passports (for instance, the British Hebrides which are islands off the west coast of Scotland that have never been separately independent). 

Usually, the names chosen have a plausible or familiar ring to them. Names that have been used include:

British Guiana (now Guyana)
British Hebrides (islands off the west coast of Scotland usually known just as "The Hebrides") 
British Honduras (now Belize)
British Hong Kong (now a Special Administrative Region of China, never had the prefix "British")
British West Indies (has never existed as a passport-issuing entity)
Burma (now Myanmar)
Ceylon (now Sri Lanka)
Dutch Guiana (now Suriname)
Eastern Samoa (now American Samoa)
Netherlands East Indies (now Indonesia)
New Granada (Presumably meaning the Spanish colony or the Republic of New Granada, 1831–1858; now in Colombia and Panama)
New Hebrides (now Vanuatu)
Rhodesia (now Zimbabwe)
South Vietnam (now Vietnam)
Spanish Guinea (now Equatorial Guinea)
Soviet Union (now divided into fifteen States)
Zanzibar (now part of Tanzania)
Zaire (now Democratic Republic of Congo)

Purpose and legality
According to sellers, the purpose of a true camouflage passport, rather than a novelty fantasy passport, is to provide false identification to be used in an emergency to protect the bearer from unwelcome attention at border crossings or anywhere that they might be asked to produce their documents and could be at risk. The camouflage passport, they say, is therefore intended primarily to deceive a customs, immigration or police officer into believing that the bearer is a person from a small, unimportant, and far away country that is not an enemy, or, in a terrorist situation, that the bearer is not a potentially high-value hostage.

Others argue, however, that the true purpose of these documents is to be used in criminal activity, including terrorism and money laundering, and that the majority of camouflage passports are bought for those purposes. After the attacks of 9/11, the United States restricted the sale of camouflage passports, although they are still legal to possess in countries such as Australia, New Zealand, and all of the European Union. Laws elsewhere may vary.

In 2011, the European Union resolved that a "non-exhaustive list of known fantasy and camouflage passports" should be drawn up that "should not be subject to recognition or non-recognition. They should not entitle their holders to cross the external borders and should not be endorsed with a visa": a list was subsequently published and last updated in February 2023.

Sellers
The producers of camouflage passports are generally internet based businesses that specialise in producing various types of identify documents that may be in real or false names. Other services often offered include offshore company formation, introductions to offshore banking and financial services providers and similar services all targeted at international mobile individuals and those interested in avoiding tax and government regulation. Despite several companies withdrawing from this market in recent years, others continue to operate, offering passports that purport to include UV tags and holograms for verisimilitude.

Fantasy passports

Fantasy passports are passport-like documents issued as a novelty or souvenir, to make a political statement or to show loyalty to a political or other cause, such as independence movements, as well as sovereign citizen, freemen on the land and redemptions movements. Souvenir United States state passports have also been issued, for Nevada or the Republic of Texas for instance, but these typically are clearly marked as novelties. Examples include:

Intergovernmental Institution for the use of Micro-algae Spirulina Against Malnutrition (IIMSAM) issued dubious UN-like Laissez Passer that were also blacklisted by the European Union

The Haudenosaunee Confederacy has issued Haudenosaunee passports which its lacrosse team has attempted to use when participating in international competitions.
Conch Republic passports. A micronation declared as a tongue-in-cheek protest secession of the city of Key West, Florida, from the US in 1982.
Manchukuo passports. Issued by the Manchukuo Temporary Government
 Newfoundland passports. Found at various tourist shops to serve as souvenirs of Newfoundland and Labrador. These mark the distinct culture of the most eastern Canadian province and oldest place of European colonization in North America. They are also reminders that Newfoundland was once an independent British Colony of Newfoundland and Dominion of Newfoundland before joining Canada in 1949.
Neue Slovenische Kunst passports. Issued by the non-territorial Slovenian art collective championed by the rock band Laibach.
Republic of Taiwan passports. Issued by various groups supporting Taiwan independence. In 2001, a Los Angeles resident successfully obtained a Brazilian visa on such a passport, and used it to travel to Brazil. In news interviews, he stated that he faced no difficulties in entering the country, while in contrast a fellow traveller using a Republic of China passport was "heckled" by Brazilian officials, possibly because they confused it with a People's Republic of China passport and took the man to be mainland Chinese. Others claim to have successfully obtained Belizean residence permits on Republic of Taiwan passports.
World Passport. According to the World Service Authority, was filed as a Machine Readable Travel Document (MRTD) with the International Civil Aviation Organization (ICAO). However, ICAO documents on MRTDs cite the World Service Authority and its passport as an example of "Fantasy Documents".
 Expo Passport. Firstly introduced in Expo 67, Expo Passport is one of the most popular souvenirs in World Expos. Visitors can collect stamps on their passports while visiting pavilions.
 The International Parliament for Safety and Peace issued "diplomatic passports". The Council of the European Union, the authorities of Portugal and the Isle of Man, and various news sources have described these as fantasy documents.

References

External links

Camouflage passports for sale from PT Shamrock Ltd., 2001. (Image archived by Internet Archive)

Passports